Sabhash is a 2000 Indian Tamil language mystery thriller film directed by K. Subash featuring R. Parthiepan, Divya Unni and Ranjith and was released on 1 September 2000. The film was remade into Hindi language as Vaada (2005).

Plot
The two people in focus are Srinivasan (R. Parthiepan) and his good friend Dharan Viswanath (Ranjith). Seenu is a loving husband of Shanti (Divya Unni), and Dharan is Shanti's ex-lover. Life is going great for Shanti and Seenu until Seenu loses his eyesight in an accident.

One day, Srinivasan and Dharan find that Shanti has died by hanging herself in their house. The police close the case as a suicide. Evidence surfaced which point to Dharan's guilt, but he resolutely maintains that he is innocent, while Srinivasan too believes him. It keeps the suspense alive successfully: with respect to Dharan's innocence and the reason behind the happenings. Srinivasan seems convinced that his wife has been murdered. One day, Dharan discovers that Seenu is not blind after all.

Who murdered Shanthi? Or was it suicide? Why did Seenu pretend to be blind? The answers to these questions form the rest of the story.

Cast

R. Parthiepan as Srinivasan (Seenu)
Divya Unni as Shanti
Ranjith as Dharan Viswanath
Delhi Ganesh as Shanti's father
Thalaivasal Vijay as Inspector Daniel Thomas
Pandu as Marriage broker
LIC Narasimhan as Judge
Poovilangu Mohan as Lawyer
Mohan Raman as Advocate Mohan
Ilavarasu
Y. S. D. Sekhar as Sub-inspector Veera Pandiyan
Sharmili as Police inspector
Radhabhai as Shanti's grandmother
Amirthalingam
Kovai Kumar
John Babu in a special appearance
Kalyan in a special appearance

Production
The film was originally titled as Paakkanum Pola Irukku.

Soundtrack
The film score and the soundtrack were composed by Deva.

Reception
The Hindu wrote "The story [..] has several plot twists, some of which are predictable. But in a film that is supposed to be a murder mystery, the badly choreographed song sequences seem to be rude interruptions. Ideally, the film would have worked better if the songs had been cut out and the editing had been tighter." Balaji Balasubramaniam wrote, "The director does have a good kernel of an idea for a crime thriller — a genre that is populated by very few memorable entries in Tamil cinema. But he fails to build upon the idea to deliver the goods. An erratic tone, misplaced comedy, sloppy editing and intrusive, unimaginative song sequences cut into the promising idea at the heart of the movie and the results, [..] are another weak entry into the thriller genre and sadness at a botched opportunity."

References

2000 films
2000s Tamil-language films
Indian films about revenge
Films shot in Seychelles
Fiction about murder
Indian mystery thriller films
Tamil films remade in other languages
Films about blind people in India
Films directed by K. Subash
2000 thriller films